Rajam is a constituency in Vizianagaram district of Andhra Pradesh. It is reserved for peoples from the Scheduled Castes and is one of the seven assembly segments of Vizianagaram (Lok Sabha constituency), along with Etcherla, Bobbili, Cheepurupalli, Gajapathinagaram, Nellimarla and Vizianagaram.  , there are a total of 219,313 electors in the constituency. Kambala Jogulu is the present MLA of the constituency, who won the 2019 Andhra Pradesh Legislative Assembly election from YSR Congress Party.

Mandals 
The four mandals that form the assembly constituency are:

Members of Legislative Assembly Vunukuru

Members of Legislative Assembly Honjaram

Members of Legislative Assembly Boddam

Members of Legislative Assembly Rajam

Election results

Assembly elections 1952

Assembly Elections 2009

Assembly Elections 2014

Assembly Elections 2019

See also 
 List of constituencies of Andhra Pradesh Legislative Assembly

References 

Assembly constituencies of Andhra Pradesh